Robert DeLaurentis (born De Laurentiis) is an American television producer and television writer.

DeLaurentis wrote the 1982 film A Little Sex, and has also written a proposed script for a Doctor Who film. He has both written and produced for television shows including The O.C., Providence , Alfred Hitchcock Presents, Fargo and The Umbrella Academy. In addition to this he has written for South Beach, and produced  The Big Easy.

References

External links

American television producers
American television writers
American male television writers
Living people
Place of birth missing (living people)
Year of birth missing (living people)